Seliwanoff’s test is a chemical test which distinguishes between aldose and ketose sugars. If the sugar contains a ketone group, it is a ketose. If a sugar contains an aldehyde group, it is an aldose. This test relies on the principle that, when heated, ketoses are more rapidly dehydrated than aldoses. It is named after Theodor Seliwanoff, the chemist who devised the test. When added to a solution containing ketoses, a red color is formed rapidly indicating a positive test. When added to a solution containing aldoses, a slower forming light pink is observed instead. 

The reagents consist of resorcinol and concentrated hydrochloric acid:

 The acid hydrolysis of polysaccharide and oligosaccharide ketoses yields simpler sugars followed by furfural.
 The dehydrated ketose then reacts with two equivalents of resorcinol in a series of condensation reactions to produce a molecule with a deep cherry red color. 
 Aldoses may react slightly to produce a faint pink color.

Fructose and sucrose are two common sugars which give a positive test.  Sucrose gives a positive test as it is a disaccharide consisting of fructose and glucose.

Generally, 6M HCl is used to run this test. Ketoses are dehydrated faster and give stronger colors. Aldoses react very slowly and give faint colors.

References 

 
 
 

Biochemistry detection methods
Reagents for organic chemistry